Osmopleura chamaeropis is a species of longhorn beetle in the Cerambycinae subfamily, and the only species in the genus Osmopleura. It was described by Horn in 1893. It is known from Georgia and Florida, USA.

References

Agallissini
Beetles described in 1893